Lego Dimensions is a Lego-themed action-adventure platform crossover video game developed by Traveller's Tales and published by Warner Bros. Interactive Entertainment, for the PlayStation 4, PlayStation 3, Wii U, Xbox One and Xbox 360. It follows the toys-to-life format, in that the player has Lego figures and a toy pad that can be played within the game itself where it features characters and environments from over 30 different franchises. The Starter Pack, containing the game, the USB toy pad, and three minifigures, was released in September 2015, while additional level packs and characters were released over the following two years.

Gameplay
Lego Dimensions features the same style of gameplay as the previous Lego video games developed by Traveller's Tales, in which up to two players control Lego minifigures based on various represented franchises. Players progress through linear levels, using their characters' abilities to solve puzzles, defeat enemies, collect collectibles such as Minikits, Characters in Peril, Gold Bricks, and attempt to reach the level's end. Characters are entered into the game by placing their respective minifigures onto a USB toy pad, with each character possessing unique abilities that can be used to solve puzzles or reach hidden areas. Using a character from a certain franchise will also unlock that franchise's Adventure World, an open-world area for players to explore and complete in-game objectives.

The Starter Pack includes the toy pad and the game's 14-level main story campaign, which revolves around Batman, Gandalf,  and Wyldstyle, while additional levels are made available by purchasing Level Packs and Story Packs. In addition to the minifigures, players can also build models of vehicles, such as the Batmobile, TARDIS, Mystery Machine, or DeLorean, and put them into the game for characters to drive. Completing objectives in the levels and adventure worlds will reward players with gold bricks, which can be used to upgrade vehicles and give them new abilities. Each adventure world also contains a red brick for players to retrieve; these will unlock special bonuses, such as visual modifiers for characters or extra assistance at finding collectible items. Unlike series such as Skylanders, Disney Infinity, and Amiibo, the minifigures, vehicles, and the USB toy pad are all made from real Lego pieces and can be freely built and customized.

All minifigures and vehicles can be used in any available level, though specific figures must be present to initially enter those levels or worlds. An additional feature called "Hire a Hero" was added shortly after the game's launch; this feature allows players to pay in-game currency to temporarily summon characters they do not own in order to complete an otherwise-inaccessible puzzle. The game's second year of content also introduced competitive multiplayer in the form of the Battle Arenas, allowing up to four players to compete in modes such as Capture the Flag. Gold bricks can be used to purchase new power-ups for the Battle Arenas. Certain packs also include exclusive features; for example, the Midway Arcade level pack unlocks playable emulations of over 20 Midway arcade titles, while the Teen Titans Go! packs unlock an exclusive Lego-themed episode of the series that can be viewed in-game.

Packs
In addition to the game's starter pack, Lego Dimensions has a wide range of packs available, split into four categories: story packs, level packs, team packs, and fun packs. Packs from the game's second year (September 2016–17) also unlock Adventure World Battle Arenas, competitive four-person multiplayer areas themed after each figure's respective franchise.

Story packs add six new levels to the game based on the represented franchise; these levels retell the story of their respective film, with characters from other franchises making occasional appearances. The packs also include one or two characters, a vehicle or gadget, and a new gateway design for the toy pad. Story packs each also unlock a new keystone for the portal, providing additional abilities.

Franchises
The game features characters and worlds from thirty different franchises, consisting of:
 Adventure Time
 The A-Team
 Back to the Future
 Beetlejuice
 DC Comics
 Doctor Who
 E.T. the Extra-Terrestrial
 Fantastic Beasts and Where to Find Them
 Ghostbusters
 Ghostbusters (2016)
 The Goonies
 Gremlins
 Harry Potter
 Jurassic World
 Knight Rider
 Legends of Chima
 The Lego Batman Movie
 Lego City
 The Lego Movie
 The Lord of the Rings
 Midway Arcade
 Mission: Impossible
 Ninjago
 Portal
 The Powerpuff Girls
 Scooby-Doo
 The Simpsons
 Sonic the Hedgehog
 Teen Titans Go!
 The Wizard of Oz

The game also features character and setting cameos from other franchises, including HAL 9000 from the Space Odyssey series, S.T.A.R. Labs from CW's The Flash, Bedrock from The Flintstones, the family room from The Jetsons, and the DNA ship from Red Dwarf. Unlike other toys-to-life series such as Skylanders and Disney Infinity, Lego Dimensions allows all figures to be compatible with the existing title, rather than releasing a sequel.

Plot
Arriving on Foundation Prime, a shapeshifting planet located in the center of the Lego multiverse, Lord Vortech (Gary Oldman), a being who has the power to shapeshift and travel through dimensions, and his robot minion X-PO (Joel McHale) seek the twelve Foundation Elements, the cornerstones of time and space itself, in a bid to merge all the dimensions into one under Vortech's control. These elements, such as the ruby slippers, the One Ring, the flux capacitor, the Palantír, the PKE meter, and kryptonite, were scattered across the dimensions long time ago, but gathered together at Foundation Prime's palace can unlock the Foundation of All Dimensions, an artifact that grants the user the power to control all of the dimensions. When X-PO voices his doubts about Vortech's plot, Vortech decides that he no longer needs him and banishes him to the dimensional void Vorton, ignoring X-PO's warning that it is too dangerous to safely harness the elements. Unfortunately for Vortech, his own body cannot handle too many more dimensional jumps, forcing him to open vortexes to the different dimensions and recruits their villains to help him search for the elements while imprisoning the heroes pulled through them. These actions damage the boundaries between the dimensions, causing them to merge and characters to be displaced.

When Robin (Scott Menville), Frodo (Elijah Wood), and MetalBeard (Nick Offerman) are pulled into the vortexes, each unknowingly in possession of one of the elements, Batman (Troy Baker), Gandalf the Grey (Tom Kane), and Wyldstyle (Elizabeth Banks) all jump in after them. The three get pulled into the same vortex and appear on Vorton, where the vortex generator they came out of explodes, prompting them to rebuild it. Aided by X-PO, the three use the generator to travel through the dimensions and search for the Foundation Elements and the five missing Keystones that power the generator (Shift, Chroma, Elemental Phase, Scale, and Locate) hoping to find their missing friends and thwart Vortech's plot. Along their journey, they meet and assist the various heroes of the dimensions they visit, such as Dorothy Gale (Laura Bailey), Homer Simpson (Dan Castellaneta), Dr. Emmett Brown (Christopher Lloyd), Wheatley (Stephen Merchant), and Scooby-Doo (Frank Welker) while fighting numerous villains, including the Wicked Witch of the West (Courtenay Taylor), Lord Business (Nolan North), Joker (Christopher Corey Smith), Master Chen (William Salyers), Saruman the White (Roger L. Jackson), Daleks (Nicholas Briggs), Lex Luthor (Travis Willingham), Riddler (Roger Craig Smith), Two-Face (Baker), Sauron (Steve Blum), General Zod (North), as well as Vortech himself twice. However, Vortech eventually realizes that X-PO is helping them. The heroes travel to Foundation Prime to find their friends and fight Vortech, but it turns out to be a diversion, allowing his lackeys to infiltrate Vorton and retrieve the trio's Foundation Elements in their absence. With all of the elements collected, Vortech unlocks the Foundation of All Dimensions (which is a green Lego plate) and is imbued with near-unlimited power. He merges Robin, Frodo, MetalBeard, and a piece of himself into a giant mutant known as the Tri, (Menville, Wood, and Offerman) and sends it to wreak havoc on the trio's home dimensions. Fearing that a failure could lead to a transformation into a similar mutant, Vortech's lackeys bail out on him.

The heroes free their friends from inside the Tri and destroy the Vortech piece, causing it to implode. After the Tri's defeat, Batman realizes that they will need all the help they can get to defeat Vortech, leading them to recruit the Twelfth Doctor (Peter Capaldi), Mystery Inc., the Ghostbusters, the space ship Defender, and GLaDOS (Ellen McLain) to their cause. While the Doctor, GLaDOS, and X-PO work on a plan to seal Vortech in a rift loop, the heroes head to Foundation Prime, fighting him along the way. With their allies' help, they are able to neutralize the Foundation of All Dimensions, which causes Foundation Prime's palace to collapse, infuriating Vortech. He grows to an enormous size and attacks the trio, but the Doctor is able to manipulate the portal technology and sucks all of them into a rift loop. Using special devices he, GLaDOS, and X-PO designed, the heroes are able to seal Vortech in an endless rift prison for all eternity, saving the multiverse.

In a post-credits scene, an unknown figure finds a piece of Vortech's body in the remains of Foundation Prime's palace. He picks it up and instantly becomes corrupted, yelling in pain as he converts into a Vorton being. Vortech's laughter is heard as the scene fades out, suggesting that the figure has been transformed into another version of Vortech.

Reception

Lego Dimensions received "generally favorable reviews", according to review aggregator Metacritic. IGN awarded it a score of 7.7 out of 10, saying "Lego Dimensions great characters and fun references consistently left me with a big dumb grin on my face." GameSpot awarded it a score of 8.0, saying "In any game within the toys-to-life genre, there's sometimes an unspoken question: is this also a great toy or just a great game? In Lego Dimensions case, the answer is easy: it's both." They also praised the open world sections of the game, stating that "While they don't feature the same level of intricacy the main game provides, they do add several more hours each to the overall experience." Polygon awarded it 8 out of 10, saying "Where the game's innovative designs push forward what it means to blend toys and games into a single experience, the writing and both companies' willingness to dig deep into their vaults, pull the whole game together." Good Game: Spawn Point Hosts Bajo and Hex both awarded the game 3 out of 5. Praise was given to the puzzles and mechanics, commenting that it may be their favourite Lego game. However, they gave harsh criticism to the pricing model. Their summation was that it was "poor value", stating that the last few Lego games were "pretty much as good as this one", but players can play as their extensive character rosters without having to buy expensive expansions."

Sales
In the UK and Ireland, Lego Dimensions landed at number 2 on the sales charts in its first week. Sales had surpassed in comparison to first week sales of other 2015 toys-to-life game competitors Skylanders: Superchargers and Disney Infinity 3.0.

Awards

Notes

References

External links

 Official website 
 

2015 video games
Action-adventure games
Crossover video games
Dimensions
Midway video game compilations
Open-world video games
PlayStation 3 games
PlayStation 4 games
Traveller's Tales games
Toys-to-life games
Video games developed in the United Kingdom
Video games featuring female protagonists
Video games about parallel universes
Video games set in the 1880s
Video games set in the 1950s
Video games set in the 1980s
Video games set in the 2010s
Video games set in the future
Video games set on fictional planets
Warner Bros. video games
Wii U games
Xbox 360 games
Xbox One games
Metafictional video games
Multiplayer and single-player video games
3D platform games
Video games scored by Ian Livingstone
Video games scored by Rob Westwood
Superhero crossover video games